Motoarena Toruń im. Mariana Rosego is a multi-use stadium in Toruń, Poland.  It is currently used mostly for motorcycle speedway matches and it is used for car racing and concerts and it is the home stadium of KST Unibax Toruń in the Speedway Ekstraliga. The stadium has a capacity of 15,500 people and was opened on 3 May 2009. It is named after Marian Rose, former speedway rider from Toruń.

Hosted

International 
 Speedway Grand Prix: 2010 (until 2016)
 European Speedway Club Champions' Cup: 2009 Final

Polish Championships 
 Individual Speedway Polish Championship Final: 2009
 Polish Pairs Speedway Championship Final: 2010
 Speedway Ekstraliga Final: 2009
 Team Speedway Junior Polish Championship Final: 2009

Musical Events
 2010: José Carreras
 2011: Rod Stewart

See also 
 Speedway in Poland
 Marian Rose Stadium

Speedway venues in Poland
Sports venues in Kuyavian-Pomeranian Voivodeship
Buildings and structures in Toruń
Sport in Toruń